Jennings v. The Perseverance, 3 U.S. (3 Dall.) 336 (1797), was a United States Supreme Court case holding that: "The decision in Wiscart v. Dauchy, (3 P. 321,) confirmed. An objection that counsel fees were allowed in the court below as part of the damages, can not be entertained unless the fact appears by the record. If a prize is sold by agreement, and the money stopped in the hands of the marshal, by a third person, not a party to the agreement, increased damages are not allowed, but only interest on the debt.."

References

External links
 

United States Supreme Court cases
United States Supreme Court cases of the Ellsworth Court
1797 in United States case law